The Unexpected Man is a play written in 1995 by Yasmina Reza.  Reza is best known in the English speaking world as the author of 'Art'.

Plot
A man and a woman sit opposite each other in the detached intimacy of a train compartment on a journey from Paris to Frankfurt. He is a world-famous author, she carries his latest novel in her bag and ponders the dilemma of reading it in front of him. As both the woman and man ponder their situation in the compartment, they bring past events and philosophies up in separate monologues. Finally in the ending of the play, they speak conversationally, and in the last line of the show the woman calls the author by his name, revealing to him that she did indeed know who he was.

Characters
Parsky: A well-known author, travelling to Frankfurt to meet his daughter's significantly older fiancée.

Martha: A middle-aged woman, a fan of Parsky's oeuvre.

French plays
1995 plays